Theridula opulenta is a species of cobweb spider in the family Theridiidae. It is found in North America and has been introduced into southern Europe.

References

External links

 

opulenta
Articles created by Qbugbot
Spiders described in 1841